is a town located in Tomata District, Okayama Prefecture, Japan. , the town had an estimated population of 12,425 in 5633 households and a population density of 30 persons per km².

Geography
Kagamino is located in north-central Okayama Prefecture. The Chugoku Mountains form its norther border with Tottori prefecture, with peaks of 1000 meters or more.  The southern part of the town is located at the western edge of the Tsuyama Basin, and the Yoshii River flows through the center of the town from north to south.

Neighboring  municipalities 
Okayama Prefecture
Tsuyama
Maniwa
Tottori Prefecture
Tottori (city)
 Misasa

Climate
Kagamino has a Humid subtropical climate (Köppen Cfa) characterized by warm summers and cool winters with heavy snowfall.  The average annual temperature in Kagamino is 13.4 °C. The average annual rainfall is 1501 mm with September as the wettest month. The temperatures are highest on average in January, at around 25.3 °C, and lowest in January, at around 1.7 °C.

Demography
Per Japanese census data, the population of Kagamino has been declining steadily since the 1950s.

History 
The area of Kagamino was part of ancient Mimasaka Province.  The town of Kagamino was established by the merger of the villages of Yoshino, Ono, Oda, Nakatani, Kagami-Minami and Kagami-kita on November 10, 1952.

On March 1, 2005, Kagamino absorbed the town of Okutsu, and the villages of Kamisaibara and Tomi, all from Tomata District.

Government
Kagamino has a mayor-council form of government with a directly elected mayor and a unicameral town council of 14 members. Kagamino, collectively with the city of Tsuyama and the towns of Nagi and Shōō, contributes four members to the Okayama Prefectural Assembly. In terms of national politics, the town is part of the Okayama 3rd district of the lower house of the Diet of Japan.

Economy
The main industry in the area is agriculture and forestry. TheYamada Bee Farm Corporation, a noted honey producer, is headquartered in Kagamino.

Education
Kagamino has eight public elementary schools and one public junior high school operated by the town government. The town does not have a high school.

Transportation

Railway 
Kagamino does not have any passenger rail service. The nearest train station is Innoshō Station on the JR West Kishin Line in neighboring Tsuyama.

Highways

International relations

Twin towns – Sister cities
Kagamino is twinned with:
 Yverdon-les-Bains, Switzerland

Local attractions
 Okutsu Onsen, hot spring resort

References

External links 

 Kagamino official website 

Towns in Okayama Prefecture